L&HR may refer to:

 Lakeside and Haverthwaite Railway, a heritage railway in Cumbria, England
 Lehigh and Hudson River Railway, a former railroad in northwestern New Jersey, United States

See also
 LHR (disambiguation)